Dr M. R. Tanga was an Indian politician from the Bharatiya Janata Party, Karnataka who was the Member of Karnataka Legislative Council from 1988 till his death in 2005. He was the party floor leader in the state Legislative Council. He was an MLC for three terms, state unit vice-president and member of the National Executive of the Bharatiya Janata Party.

References 

1935 births
2005 deaths
Members of the Karnataka Legislative Council
Bharatiya Janata Party politicians from Karnataka